Tmesisternus dohertyi is a species of beetle in the family Cerambycidae. It was described by Karl Jordan in 1894. It is known from Papua New Guinea and Indonesia.

References

dohertyi
Beetles described in 1894